Myron Weaver House is a historic home located at Branchport in Yates County, New York. It is an Italianate style structure.

It was listed on the National Register of Historic Places in 1994.

References

Houses on the National Register of Historic Places in New York (state)
Italianate architecture in New York (state)
Houses in Yates County, New York
National Register of Historic Places in Yates County, New York